Changate is a village in Central District of Botswana.

Location
It is located close to the border with Zimbabwe.

Education
It has a primary school.

Healthcare
It has a clinic.

Population
The population was 1169, in 2011 census.

References

Populated places in Central District (Botswana)
Villages in Botswana